DART Light Rail is a light rail mass transit system operated by Dallas Area Rapid Transit, serving portions of the Dallas/Fort Worth Metroplex, Texas, United States. The network consists of sixty-five stations on four lines: Blue Line, Green Line, Orange Line and Red Line.

All but one of the stations along the DART Light Rail network are open-air structures featuring passenger canopies for protection from adverse weather conditions. The lone underground station is Cityplace. All stations include works of public art as part of the DART Station Art & Design Program. These works include independent works or as pieces incorporated into the canopies, columns, pavers, windscreens, fencing and landscaping present at all stations.

Stations

Stations planned and under construction

While the Silver Line follows DART's color coordinated scheme for light rail lines, it will operate from stations designed for a different mode of rolling stock than the rest of the system — utilizing diesel multiple units on a corridor shared with freight trains instead of the electrically powered and exclusive light rail.

Deferred and ghost stations
Several stations proposed for the DART Light Rail network are classified as deferred. As defined by DART, a deferred station is one that has been identified, but will not be constructed until land use changes warrant the construction of a station. In addition to the deferred stations, the network also features a single ghost station, the Knox–Henderson Station. The underground station was excavated at the time of the original construction of the Red and Blue Lines, only to have plans subsequently scrapped due to neighborhood opposition.

References 

 
DART Light Rail
DART Light Rail